Jelena Erić (born October 12, 1979) is a retired Serbian handball player. She was a member of the Serbian national team.

References

External links
EHF profile

Living people
1979 births
Sportspeople from Novi Sad
Serbian female handball players

Mediterranean Games silver medalists for Serbia
Competitors at the 2005 Mediterranean Games
Mediterranean Games medalists in handball